Paul Darby-Dowman (born 25 November 1977) is a British sprint canoer who competed from the mid-1990s to the mid-2000s (decade). Competing in three Summer Olympics, he earned his best finish of seventh in the K-2 1000 m event at Athens in 2004.

References
Sports-Reference.com profile

1977 births
Canoeists at the 1996 Summer Olympics
Canoeists at the 2000 Summer Olympics
Canoeists at the 2004 Summer Olympics
Living people
Olympic canoeists of Great Britain
British male canoeists